The Duchy of Orléanais is a former royal duchy, which was created during reign of Hugh Capet by elevating the former County of Orléans. In 1498, as part of a centralisation of France under Louis XII, the duchy was dissolved and replaced by the Province of Orléanais which was informally still known as the 'Duchy of Orléanais'.

History 

The Duchy of Orléanais was created in 1344 by raising the former County of Orléans to a Dukedom under King Philip VI for his second son Philip de Valois. With the creation of the duchy, several localities around the former county were also integrated, they included the County of Beaugency and the Seigneurities of Neuville-aux-Bois, Yèvre-le-Châtel, Châteauneuf-en-Thymerais, Lorris, and Boiscommun. In 1375, Prince Philip died without a legitimate heir, the title of 'Duke of Orléans' and the duchy itself were merged into the royal domain (crown lands) of the King of France.

In 1392, the duchy was re-created by King Charles VI for his younger brother Louis de Valois-Orléans. The duke was later succeeded by his son Charles de Valois-Orléans who reigned until 1465 when he died of natural causes. He was succeeded by his own son Louis de Valois-Orléans, who became King Louis XII in 1498 and the title was merged into the crown once more.

In 1498, as part of a centralisation of the different regions of France, the duchy was dissolved and replaced by the new Province of Orléanais.

Footnotes

References 

 
 
 
 
States and territories established in the 980s
States and territories disestablished in the 1490s
1498 disestablishments
Geographic history of France
Centre-Val de Loire
Orléanais
History of Centre-Val de Loire
History of Pays de la Loire
History of Cher (department)
History of Essonne
History of Eure-et-Loir
History of Indre-et-Loire
History of Loir-et-Cher
History of Orléans
Former monarchies of Europe
Former duchies of France